Samuel Davenport was an early settler of Australia

Samuel Davenport also may refer to:

 Samuel Davenport (engraver) (1783–1867), English line engraver
 Samuel Arza Davenport (1834–1911), politician from Pennsylvania